Christopher Heighington (born 14 January 1982) is a former professional rugby league footballer. He played for the Wests Tigers and Cronulla-Sutherland Sharks, winning a premiership with each, before finishing his career with the Newcastle Knights.

Background
He was born in Camden, New South Wales, Australia.

Club career

Wests Tigers

A Umina Bunnies junior, Heighington made his début for Wests Tigers in 2003. He later said, "To be honest, I couldn't believe I was making my début. It was a great experience. It came so quickly. I only started the pre-season at the end of 2002." He made seven appearances from the bench that year, and was a backup again in 2004. By 2005 he had cemented his place in the team and played from the interchange bench in the Tigers' 30–16 victory in the 2005 NRL grand final over the North Queensland Cowboys.

As NRL Premiers Wests faced Super League champions Bradford Bulls in the 2006 World Club Challenge. Heighington played at second-row forward in the Tigers' 30–10 loss.

Heighington won the award for Wests Tigers' Player of the Year for 2008. He was selected to play in the 2008 Country Origin side as well as the Prime Minister's XIII team which visited Papua New Guinea. He was called into the 2009 Prime Minister's XIII for the injured Luke Lewis.

Before the start of the 2011 season, Ricky Stuart named Heighington in a "Blues in Waiting" squad, for potential future NSW State of Origin players. He was described as one of the players, "on the cusp of selection." He was considered by some unlucky to have not played State of Origin.

Having played in every game of the 2007, 2008, 2010 and 2011 seasons, Heighington set the record for most appearances by a Wests Tigers player in 2012, surpassing the milestone of 185 set by John Skandalis.
Described by team-mate Benji Marshall as, "the heart and soul of Wests Tigers on and off the field," the club controversially released him after failing to make the semi-finals in 2012.

Signing a three-year contract with the Cronulla-Sutherland Sharks, Heighington said, "'I don't know what to say except I'm a bit disappointed. I thought I would be a one-team player but, at the end of the day, if the coach doesn't want you, he doesn't want you."

Grand final controversy
Following the grand final victory, Heighington was interviewed by Nine Network sideline commentator Matthew Johns, who asked Heighington to describe the feeling of winning the premiership. Heighington replied "Yeah mate it’s fucking awesome, you don’t know how to fucking ... there’s no words for it, it’s just fucking unbelievable". In the following days, the Wests Tigers club issued a statement apologising for the inappropriate language used by some of their players.

Cronulla-Sutherland Sharks
In Round 1 of the 2013 NRL season, Heighington made his club début for the Cronulla-Sutherland Sharks against the Gold Coast Titans playing off the interchange bench in the 12-10 win at Remondis Stadium. He played in all of the Sharks 26 matches and scored 1 try.

In an effort to motivate his 2016 Sharks teammates to win their first premiership, Heighington bet them his foreskin: he promised to subject himself to being circumcised if his team won.

In 2016, he came off the bench in Cronulla's first premiership win 14-12 over the Melbourne Storm for his second premiership victory.

Heighington played his 300th game on 1 April 2017, saying, "It’s hard to believe I’m on the same list of 300-game players as him. To see my name alongside Brad Fittler, Darren Lockyer, Terry Lamb, Andrew Ettinghausen, and many more, I’m just so grateful." As of April 2017, Heighington was one of only three current NRL players to have eclipsed 300 NRL games, the others being Melbourne's Cooper Cronk and Cameron Smith.

Newcastle Knights
After 116 games with the Sharks, Heighington signed a 1-year contract with the Newcastle Knights starting in 2018.

In round 1 of the 2018 season, Heighington made his début for the Knights in their 19-18 golden point extra-time win over the Manly Warringah Sea Eagles.

On 31 July 2018, Heighington announced that the 2018 season would be his last after a 16-season career. He has played over 330 professional games with 3 clubs, winning a premiership with the Tigers in 2005, and the Sharks in 2016.

Highlights
First Grade début: 2003 – Round 1, Wests Tigers v St George Illawarra Dragons, Stadium Australia, Sydney, 15 March.
Premierships:  2005 – Wests Tigers defeated North Queensland Cowboys 30 – 16 in the Grand Final at Stadium Australia, Sydney, 2 October.
Premierships:  2016 - Cronulla Sharks defeated Melbourne Storm 14 - 12 in the Grand Final  at Stadium Australia, Sydney, 2 October.
NSW Country Origin début: 2008 – NSW Country Origin v NSW City Origin, WIN Stadium, Wollongong, New South Wales, 2 May.
NSW Country Origin Selection: 2008, 2011
Prime Minister's XIII début: 2008 – Prime Minister's XIII v Papua New Guinea, Lloyd Robson Oval, Port Moresby, Papua New Guinea, 27 September.
Prime Minister's XIII Selection: 2008–2009
 300 First Grade Games round 5 2017

Representative career
Heighington has a British passport through his father, and was eligible to represent England if he chose to (Heighington's father Tom emigrated to Australia when he was about 15 from County Durham, an area the family have retained strong links with, including their association with the village of Heighington near Darlington). Heighington took up the option in 2011 and was named in the England train-on squad for the 2011 Four-Nations. Coach Steve McNamara noting, "His work-rate and work ethic are first class." Heighington played in the warm up test against France and also the opening game of the Four Nations against Wales. He scored his first international try against Wales after Gareth Widdop put him over the line. Heighington played in all the preliminary games of the Four Nations, scoring a further try, but was ruled out of participating in the final.

In October 2017 he was selected in the England squad for the 2017 Rugby League World Cup.

References

External links

Newcastle Knights profile
Chris Heighington at NRL.com
(archived by web.archive.org) Chris Heighington at Wests Tigers
Statistics at rlwc2017.com

1982 births
Australian rugby league players
Australian people of English descent
England national rugby league team players
Newcastle Knights players
Cronulla-Sutherland Sharks players
Wests Tigers players
NRL All Stars players
Prime Minister's XIII players
Country New South Wales Origin rugby league team players
Rugby league second-rows
Rugby league locks
Rugby league props
Rugby league players from Sydney
Living people